Cryptandra leucopogon is a species of flowering plant in the family Rhamnaceae and is endemic to the southwest of Western Australia. It was first formally described in 1848 by Siegfried Reissek in Plantae Preissianae from an unpublished description by Carl Meissner. The specific epithet (leucopogon) means "white beard".

This cryptandra grows on undulating plains in the Avon Wheatbelt, Coolgardie, Esperance Plains, Jarrah Forest and Mallee bioregions of south-western Western Australia.

References

leucopogon
Rosales of Australia
Flora of Western Australia
Plants described in 1848